Batang-Semarang Toll Road  is a 75 kilometers long highway that connects Batang area with Semarang, Central Java, Indonesia. This toll road is part of Trans-Java Expressway which will connect Merak to Banyuwangi of the island of Java. The toll road is operational since 2018.

Sections
Until November 2017, its construction progress is at 55.7 percent.
The construction of this toll road is divided into 5 sections:
Section I, beginning of project - East Batang (3.2 km)
Section II, East Batang - Weleri (36.35 km)
Section III, Weleri - Kendal (11.05 km)
Section IV, Kendal - Kaliwungu (13.5 km)
Section V, Kaliwungu - Krapyak (10.9 km)

Exits and Gates
Note: The number on the exits is based on the distance from the western terminus of the Jakarta-Cikampek Toll Road, while the distance numbers are based on the distance from the western terminus of this toll road only

References

Toll roads in Java
Transport in Central Java